Richard Farrer (born 9 April 1971) is a South African-American former professional soccer player who spent five seasons in the USISL, half a season each in South Africa and England, and seven seasons with the Dallas Burn in Major League Soccer (MLS).

Professional
During his college years, Farrer also played for the Albuquerque Gunners of the USISL. In the fall of 1990, the Gunners became the New Mexico Roadrunners before changing their name to the New Mexico Chiles in 1991. Farrer remained with the team through all these name changes. He returned to the Chiles in 1993. He played the first half of the 1994-1995 season with AmaZulu in the South Africa Premier Soccer League. He then tried out with Lincoln City F.C. of the English Third Division for the second half of the season but left England with an ankle injury without having signed a contract. After rehabilitating his injured ankle, he returned to the Chiles in 1995.

On 7 February 1996, the Dallas Burn selected Farrer in the 12th round (113th overall) in the 1996 MLS Inaugural Player Draft. In 1997, the Burn sent him on loan to the New Orleans Riverboat Gamblers for three games. He played seven seasons as a defender with the Burn, retiring from playing in the middle of the 2002 MLS season on 17 June 2002, to enter law school at the University of Texas at Austin. He graduated from law school in 2005.

References

External links
Player profile at MLS

1971 births
Living people
Soccer players from Johannesburg
South African soccer players
South African expatriate soccer players
New Mexico Lobos men's soccer players
English Football League players
Lincoln City F.C. players
New Mexico Roadrunners players
New Orleans Riverboat Gamblers players
USISL players
New Mexico Chiles (USISL) players
FC Dallas players
Texas lawyers
Major League Soccer players
Association football defenders